David Brent Heavener (born December 22, 1953) is an American singer, songwriter, director, actor, composer, producer and writer, specialising in low-budget features and direct-to-video action films.

Early life
David was born on December 22, 1953 in Louisville, Kentucky.  At the age of 17, he moved to Nashville to pursue his career as a country music singer and songwriter. Within a few years, David had written two top-ten hits and was writing music for hit shows such as Hee-Haw and The Tonight Show.

Career
Within five years, with no film production education and little money, David had written, directed, produced and starred in a half-dozen films. That number now exceeds thirty films and rising. As a distributor, he has released hundreds of titles worldwide.

David has directed Academy Award winner Martin Landau and nominees Tony Curtis, Sally Kirkland and Karen Black.  Other actors who have worked with David include Eric Estrada, Joe Estevez, Robert Reed, Marc Singer, Margot Kidder, Oliver Reed, "Rowdy" Roddy Piper and Ernest Borgnine.

Many of his movies have aired on HBO, Showtime, USA and network television. As an actor, he has also guest-starred on such TV series as Hunter and Days Of Our Lives. He has been featured on Entertainment Tonight, Backstage West and Dr. Flim Flam's comedy hour.

One of his most recent films, Dawn of the Living Dead, remained on Wal-Mart's top-10 list of DVD sales for 12 consecutive weeks.

Troma Entertainment distributes many of his films, including: Dragon Fury I, Dragon Fury II, Eye of the Stranger, Jurassic Women, Outlaw Prophet, Prime Target, Ragin' Cajun, Twisted Justice, and Vendetta.

Filmography

Movies

References

Further reading

External links
 
 
 
 

1958 births
Living people
Writers from Louisville, Kentucky
Male actors from Louisville, Kentucky
Musicians from Louisville, Kentucky
Singers from Kentucky
Songwriters from Kentucky
Film directors from Kentucky
Country musicians from Kentucky